James & Alice is a 2016 Indian Malayalam-language drama film written and directed by Sujith Vaassudev starring Prithviraj Sukumaran and Vedhika in the lead roles. Music is composed by Gopi Sundar. The film was released on May 5, 2016.

Plot summary
James is a well trained artist and corporate filmmaker with advertisements and his wife Alice works in a bank. They get married against Alice's father's wish due to his lack of career, but since then have led successful marriage for seven years and has a child out of it. However the seven-year itch starts with both of them focused on their respective careers. Their busy lifestyles and misunderstandings results in filing a divorce. A day before divorce, James meets with a freaky car accident. In hospital, facing coma James hallucinates/dreams St.Peter's presence and both of them reviewing his life; his mistakes and the changes he could've done. Whether James realises his mistakes and be able to come back to his life forms the crux of the movie.

Cast

 Prithviraj Sukumaran as James
 Vedhika as Alice (voice dubbed by Angel Shijoy)
 Sijoy Varghese as St. Peter
 Sai Kumar as Davis Thekkeparambil
 Kishor Satya as Dr Alexander
 Parvathy Nair as Nandana Varma/Nandu
 Manju Pillai as Advocate Rohini
 Emine Salman as Isabel (Pinky)
 Anupama Parameswaran as Isabel (Adult Pinky)  
 Vijayaraghavan as Dr. Mohan
 Sudheer Karamana as K T Annan
 Arjun Nandhakumar as Yoga Thinesh
Shaani Shiki as Mithun
 Sudheesh as Subin
 Indrans as Abrahanm
 Tini Tom as Kazoo
 Ganapathi as Ibrahim
 Adil Ibrahim as Soubin
 Neeraj Madhav as Sketch
 Naseer Sankranthi as K.T Annan's P.A
 Biju Menon as Rohini's Husband (only in a photo)
 Puneeth Rajkumar as Appu (only in special appearance)

Production
The filming began on 15 January 2016. Prithviraj and Vedhika previously acted together in Kaaviya Thalaivan (2014).
Movie shooting was wrapped on March 31, 2016.

Soundtrack 

Anil Johnson was signed in as the composer first. But he opted out before filming had begun. Music was composed by Gopi Sundar, and released on Muzik 247 label.

Release 
Initially James & Alice was scheduled to release on 29 April 2016, later postponed and released on 5 May 2016.

Reception

Critical reception 
The Times of India gave 2.5 out of 5 stars stating "The story arc of James and Alice is quite in sync with the analogy. Presented in a fragmented, flashback-heavy style, the movie is a simple portrait of a contemporary relationship, of a young family that is going through a rocky patch".
Malayala Manorama gave 2.5 out of 5 stars stating "An exceedingly slow-paced film, with less humour or other remarkable agents, James and Alice isn't everyone's cup of tea. The feather touch of something celestial keeps it engaging, but the magic, sadly wanes".
IndiaGlitz gave 2.5 out of 5 stars stating "Sujith Vasudev has done well for a directorial debut. There are certain elements that he will have to tweak to work for the larger audience. Gopi Sunder at the music section has done well yet again. The visually alluring frames need a special mention and the cinematographer has done well to give an artistic rendering to the tale".

Home media 
James & Alice DVD was released on Satyam Audios on 22 July 2016.

Awards and nominations

References

External links
 James & Alice at the Internet Movie Database

2016 films
2010s Malayalam-language films
Films scored by Gopi Sundar
Indian drama films
2016 drama films